Bryan Heynen (born 6 February 1997) is a Belgian professional footballer who plays for Belgian club Genk. He plays as a midfielder.

Career 

Heynen is a youth exponent from K.R.C. Genk. He made his Belgian Pro League debut at 25 July 2015 in a 3–1 home win against OH Leuven. He replaced Wilfred Ndidi after 66 minutes.

Career statistics

Honours
Genk
Belgian First Division A: 2018–19
Belgian Cup: 2020–21

References

External links

1997 births
Living people
Association football midfielders
Belgian footballers
Belgium under-21 international footballers
Belgium youth international footballers
K.R.C. Genk players
Belgian Pro League players
Place of birth missing (living people)